Twelfth Night, or, What You Will is a videotaped 1988 television adaptation of Kenneth Branagh's stage production for the Renaissance Theatre Company of William Shakespeare's Twelfth Night first broadcast in the UK by Channel 4 on 30 December 1988. Made by Thames Television, in collaboration with Renaissance, it stars Frances Barber as Viola and Richard Briers as Malvolio. The recording was shot on a single set with the appearance of a wintry garden. The costumes are Victorian, and the time of year is Christmas.

Cast

Reception
Michael Brooke, in his piece for the BFI's screenonline website, particularly commends Briers performance. His "Malvolio is a delight, segueing seamlessly from self-righteous pomposity at inappropriate revelry to truly grotesque self-delusion as he proffers love to his mistress while clad in yellow stockings".

References

External links
 

1988 television films
1988 films
Channel 4 television dramas
Television shows produced by Thames Television
Television series by Fremantle (company)
Films scored by Patrick Doyle
British television films
Filmed stage productions
Kenneth Branagh
1980s English-language films